Amit is a male given name of Indian or Hebrew origin.

In Hebrew, Amit means "friend", "colleague" or "member of the organization". The word appears in the Bible twelve times, mostly in Leviticus. Though traditionally a common male name, it is being increasingly used as a female name in Israel. Nevertheless, it is still among the most popular names given to Jewish boys in Israel. But till date it has not been recognised as a Jewish name by many Rabbis and Religious Leaders

Given name
 Amit Behl (born 1955), Indian television actor
 Amit S. Bakshi, Indian hockey player
 Amit Bhadana (born 1994), Indian comedy YouTuber
 Amit Sharma Indian Born in India Uttar Pradesh Deoria 
 Amit Chaudhuri (born 1962), Indian novelist, poet, essayist, literary critic, editor, singer and music composer
 Amit Kumar Dahiya Indian wrestler, 2020 Olympic Silver Medalist
 Amit Deshmukh (born 1976), Indian politician and minister in state Government of Maharashtra
 Amit Farkash (born 1976), Canadian-born Israeli actress and singer
 Amit Gershon (born 1995), Israeli basketball player 
 Amit Inbar (born 1972), Israeli Olympic competitive windsurfer, and kitesurfer
 Amit Ivry (born 1989), Israeli Olympic swimmer and national record holder
 Amit Kilam, drummer of Indian Ocean, a contemporary Indian fusion music band 
 Amit Kulilay, birth name of Taiwanese singer A-mei
 Amit Kumar (disambiguation), several people
 Amit Lang (born 1970), Israeli judoka
 Amit Madheshiya, Indian photographer and filmmaker
 Amit Mehta (born 1971), United States district judge
 Amit Mishra (born 1982), Indian cricketer
 Amit Mishra (singer), Indian singer and songwriter
 Amit Nimade (born 1976), Indian photographer
 Amit Patel, Indian-American cardiac surgeon
 Amit Pathak, Indian former cricketer
 Amit Sebastian Paul, member of the Swedish pop group A*Teens
 Amit Rai, Indian film director
 Amit Sadh (born 1983), Indian actor
 Amit Sana, India singer who finished second in the 2005 Indian Idol contest
 Amit Shah (born 1964), Indian politician and the current  minister of Home affairs, Government of India
 Amit Sharma (cricketer) (born 1966), Indian cricketer
 Amit Shukla, Kenyan male cricketer
 Amit Ben Shushan (born 1985), Israeli football player
 Amit Simhon (born 1989), Israeli basketball player
 Amit Singh (cricketer), Indian cricketer
 Amit Singhal, senior vice president and software engineer at Google
 Amit Tamir (born 1979), Israeli basketball player
 Amit Trivedi (born 1979), Indian film music director and singer
 Amith Thenuka Vidanagamage, Sri Lankan politician
 Amit Yadav (born 1989), Indian cricketer
 Amit Singh (scientist), microbiologist

Surname
 Daniel Amit, Israeli physicist and pacifist
 Galila Ron-Feder Amit (born 1949), Israeli children books author
 Meir Amit (1921–2009), Israeli politician and general
 Uri Amit, Israeli politician
 Yehuda Amit, Israeli rabbi
 Yitzchak Amit, judge on the Israeli Supreme Court

See also
 Ameet
 
 AMIT, an American Jewish Zionist volunteer organization
 Amita (disambiguation), feminine form

References

Indian masculine given names
Hebrew-language given names